André Postema (born 2 November 1969) is a Dutch Labour politician. He has been a member of the Senate since 7 June 2011, President of the Benelux Parliament since 1 January 2017, and in 2018 Labour Party leader in the Senate. He was a member of the municipal council of Maastricht from 2002 to 2005.  Since 2014  he is the Chair of the board of LVO, an educational institution of 20 secondary schools in the province of Limburg with 26,000 pupils and 3,000 employees

References

External links 
 
 André Postema at the website of the Senate
 André Postema at the website of the Labour Party

1969 births
Labour Party (Netherlands) politicians
Living people
Members of the Senate (Netherlands)
Municipal councillors of Maastricht
Politicians from Groningen (city)